Kalateh-ye Anamusi (also Romanized as Kalāteh-ye Ānāmūsī) is a village in Atrak Rural District, Maneh District, Maneh and Samalqan County, North Khorasan Province, Iran. At the 2006 census, its population was 39, in 9 families.

References 

Populated places in Maneh and Samalqan County